Kershaw Correctional Institution is a medium-security state prison for men located in Kershaw, Lancaster County, South Carolina, owned and operated by the South Carolina Department of Corrections.  

The facility was opened in 1997 and has a capacity of 1403 inmates held at medium security.

References

Prisons in South Carolina
Buildings and structures in Lancaster County, South Carolina
1997 establishments in South Carolina